The Corral del Carbón, originally al-Funduq al-Jadida, is a 14th-century historic building in the Spanish city of Granada (Andalusia). It is the only Nasrid alhóndiga or funduq (a commercial warehouse or inn) preserved in the Iberian peninsula. The building is located south of the Albaicin quarter, near the present-day Cathedral (formerly the city's Great Mosque).

History

The building dates from the Nasrid period but the exact date of its construction is not known. It is believed to be from the early 14th century, before 1336 (when it is mentioned in some historical documents). Its original name was al-Funduq al-Jadida or "the New Inn/Warehouse". Like other urban caravanserais (known as funduqs in al-Andalus and Morocco) at that time, it was a commercial and trading center serving as a warehouse for grain and as an inn and storage facility for merchants from outside the city. The existence of caravanserais can be traced in part from the Greek pandocheion structures (from which the word funduq derives), through the later Roman horreum until Islamic times. While most funduqs in al-Andalus were modest buildings which have since disappeared, the Funduq al-Jadida reportedly belonged to the wives of the Nasrid sultans and thus had a more monumental appearance.

It was located next to the city's central bazaar, the qaysariyya (known today as the Alcaicería), which in turn was located next to the city's Great Mosque (its main Friday mosque), occupied today by the Cathedral. A small bridge, called al-qantarat al-jadida ("new bridge") until 1501 and later Puente del carbón or Puente del Álamo or Puente de los Curtidores (Qantarat al-Dabbayin), was located on the Darro River and linked the building with the bazaar. The building's current name,

In 1494, after the fall of Granada to Christian Spain, the Catholic Monarchs granted it to their lieutenant, Juan de Arana or Sancho Arana. Upon his death in 1531 the building was sold by public auction and became a theatrical courtyard (a corral de comedias) until at least 1593. During this period the interior of the building was modified in order to accommodate theater audiences. It was then used in the 17th century as a tenement or residential complex while the ground floor was used as a place to weigh and store coal, which gave the building its present name Corral del Carbón ("Courtyard of Coal").

In 1887 the Commission of Historical and Artistic Monuments of the province of Granada requested to purchase the building from its private owners. In 1918 it was declared a National Monument but was threatened by a state of disrepair. Finally, in 1928, Leopoldo Torres Balbás, the curator and chief architect of the Alhambra, arranged for the property to be purchased by the government with the help of revenues from Alhambra ticket sales to the Alhambra. The deed of purchase was signed on October 24 of that year, and the many families residing in the building were subsequently evicted. Torres Balbas was charged with restoring and repairing the building, a process which took place in two phases from 1929 to 1931. This restoration also removed many modern or more recent additions to the building, as well as replacing the roofs and floors.

In 1992 the building was again restored by the architect Rafael Soler Márquez. The facade underwent another process of cleaning and consolidation by the company Siglos Conservación y Restauración, s.l., under the direction of Lola Blanca López and Lourdes Blanca López, which was completed in 2006.

Architecture 
The building's original medieval interior has not been preserved intact, but its general layout has remained the same. It features a simple floor plan with a nearly square central courtyard (measuring 16.8 by 15.6 meters) surrounded by a three-story gallery, similar to funduqs in Morocco such as those of Fez. A stone basin and former fountain stands at the center of the courtyard.

Its most notable feature is the monumental projecting entrance gateway, with the doors situated within a large iwan (a vaulted space open to one side, originating in ancient Sassanian architecture). The building's architectural form can thus be traced to Middle Eastern architectural models like those of Egypt and further east, where similar monumental entrances were more common. A similar form is also found in the Gate of Justice (Puerta de la Justicia) at the Alhambra. The ornamentation of the facade, however, is more strictly Nasrid or Moorish. The alfiz (square frame) has featuring multilobed and interlacing arch motifs around the archway and carved arabesques filling the spandrels, as well as mocárabes (muqarnas) sculpting in the vault of the iwan above the doorway. Above the alfiz frame is a horizontal band with an Arabic Kufic inscription of Surah 112 of the Qur'an, and above this is a double-arched window. On either side of the window are panels of decorative plaster carved with sebka and arabesque patterns. The projecting entrance is topped by a typical wooden eaves supported by corbels, as was typical of Andalusi and Moroccan architecture.

Current use
Today the building is a tourist attraction and historic site in the city. It also houses the offices of the City of Granada Orchestra, and the International Festival of Music and Dance of Granada, and is occasionally used for various cultural performances.

References 

Buildings and structures in Granada
Buildings and structures completed in the 14th century
Corral de comedias
Alhóndigas
Nasrid architecture
Caravanserais